Yervandashat may refer to:
Yervandashat (ancient city), an ancient city and one of the historic capitals of Armenia now within the Republic of Turkey
Yervandashat, Armenia, a modern village in Armenia named after the nearby ancient city of Yervandashat